Zeytun in Iran may refer to:
 Zeytun, Jahrom, Fars Province
 Zeytun, Rostam, Fars Province
 Zeytun, Kohgiluyeh and Boyer-Ahmad
 Zeytun-e Sofla